The 1966/67 NTFL season was the 46th season of the Northern Territory Football League (NTFL).

St Marys have won their seventh premiership title while defeating Darwin in the grand final by 22 points.

Grand Final

References 

Northern Territory Football League seasons
NTFL